Simon Alexander Ronald Beveridge (born 1961) is Roman Catholic priest. He was formerly an Anglican clergyman and Royal Navy chaplain. He was one of the handful of Commando trained chaplains. He has also competed in amateur horse racing, thus earning the nickname "The Galloping Padre".

Early life and education
Beveridge was born in 1961. He studied at the University of Nottingham, graduating with a Bachelor of Arts (BA) degree in 1984. From 1984 to 1987, he trained for Holy Orders at Chichester Theological College, an Anglo-Catholic theological college.

Ordained ministry

Church of England
Beveridge was ordained in the Church of England as a deacon in 1987 and as a priest in 1988. He was the vicar of Marydown until 1993, when he joined the Royal Navy, passing his commando course in the same year. He subsequently served with 42 Commando Royal Marines and served on operations in Sierra Leone.

Beveridge is also known as the "Galloping Padre" since he learned to ride (at Mr Frost's Yard at Buckfastleigh) whilst serving with the Royal Marines at CTCRM Lympstone in 2004. While serving in HMS Bulwark in 2005 he took the Amateur National Hunt Jockey's course at the British Racing School in Newmarket and gained his Category 'A' racing licence. In December 2007 he became the first priest to win a point-to-point with a 50–1 victory at Wadebridge. In 2008, aged 46, and whilst chaplain at the Royal Naval Air Station Yeovilton, he represented the Navy at the Grand Military Cup and became the first Navy chaplain to ride at Sandown, though he unfortunately fell on the last circuit after being intercepted by a riderless horse.

He was an early advocate of the Royal Navy/Royal Marines Trauma Risk Management project (TRIM) and used the technique when, as chaplain to Commando Helicopter Force, a helicopter crashed on the flight deck of RFA Argus, injuring three men, one very gravely.

Roman Catholic Church
On 17 June 2017, Beveridge was ordained as a deacon of the Roman Catholic Church by Robert Byrne, Auxiliary Bishop for Birmingham. Beveridge serves the Personal Ordinariate of Our Lady of Walsingham in Scotland. He was ordained to the priesthood by William Nolan, Bishop of Galloway, on 14 December 2017.

Personal life 

Fr. Beveridge and his wife Sarah have two children and lived in Devon before moving to Wigtownshire, in Galloway, Scotland.

References 

Living people
Royal Navy chaplains
20th-century English Anglican priests
21st-century English Anglican priests
21st-century English Roman Catholic priests
People of the personal ordinariates
1961 births
Anglican priest converts to Roman Catholicism